Megachile kyotensis is a species of bee in the family Megachilidae. It was described by Alfken in 1931.

References

Kyotensis
Insects described in 1931